Pop Express was a Yugoslav music magazine that got published in Zagreb for less than a year during the 1969-1970 time frame.

History
Pop Express was launched in 1969. It was published by Centar za kulturnu djelatnost omladine Zagreba (Center for Cultural Activity of Zagreb Youth), every second Monday in a month. The magazine's editor-in-chief was Darko Stuparić. The first issue was released on 10 February 1969, and the last, 23rd issue on 17 January 1970.

In an interview for the documentary series Rockovnik, chronicler Vladimir Spičanović said about the magazine:

Journalists and contributors
Some of the journalists and contributors to Pop Express include:

References

Biweekly magazines
Magazines published in Croatia
Croatian-language magazines
Croatian music history
Defunct magazines published in Yugoslavia
Magazines established in 1969
Magazines disestablished in 1970
Mass media in Zagreb
Music magazines
Yugoslav rock music